Ignatas Konovalovas (born 8 December 1985) is a Lithuanian road bicycle racer, who currently rides for UCI WorldTeam . Konovalovas has won the Lithuanian National Time Trial Championships seven times, in 2006, 2008, 2009, 2010, 2013, 2016, and 2017.

Early life
Konovalovas was born in Panevėžys, the son of Laima Zilporytė, an Olympian cyclist, and Valerijus Konovalovas, a cycling coach. He has a sister, Irma, who is eight years younger.

Professional career

Konovalovas finished third in the European Junior Team Pursuit Championships in 2003, third in the European Under-23 Team Pursuit Championships in 2007, and second in the European Under-23 Road Race Championships in 2007. In 2009, Konovalovas won the final time trial of the Giro d'Italia.

In June 2021, Konovalovas was forced to abandon the 2021 Tour de France, after being involved in a crash on the opening stage and being knocked unconscious.

Major results

2003
 3rd  Team pursuit, UEC European Junior Track Championships
2005
 3rd Time trial, National Road Championships
2006
 National Road Championships
1st  Time trial
2nd Road race
 1st  Overall Ronde de l'Isard
1st Points classification
1st Stage 1
 2nd Les Boucles du Sud-Ardèche
 3rd  Team pursuit, UEC European Under-23 Track Championships
2007
 UEC European Under-23 Road Championships
2nd  Road race
4th Time trial
 National Road Championships
2nd Road race
2nd Time trial
 5th Overall Ronde de l'Isard
1st Stage 3
2008
 1st  Time trial, National Road Championships
 4th Overall Tour de Luxembourg
1st Stage 2
2009
 1st  Time trial, National Road Championships
 1st Giro del Mendrisiotto
 1st Stage 21 (ITT) Giro d'Italia
 7th Overall Danmark Rundt
 8th Time trial, UCI Road World Championships
2010
 1st  Time trial, National Road Championships
 9th Overall Tour du Poitou-Charentes
2012
 2nd Time trial, National Road Championships
2013
 National Road Championships
1st  Time trial
2nd Road race
2014
 National Road Championships
2nd Time trial
3rd Road race
2015
 1st  Overall Four Days of Dunkirk
 1st  Mountains classification Tour du Haut Var
 2nd Velothon Wales
 3rd Time trial, National Road Championships
 3rd Overall Circuit des Ardennes
1st Stage 3 (TTT)
 5th Classic Sud-Ardèche
 5th Cholet-Pays de Loire
 10th Tour du Finistère
2016
 1st  Time trial, National Road Championships
 1st Stage 1 (TTT) La Méditerranéenne
2017
 National Road Championships
1st  Road race
1st  Time trial
 4th Overall Four Days of Dunkirk
1st Stage 5
2018
 2nd Tour du Doubs
2021
 1st  Road race, National Road Championships
2022
 3rd Road race, National Road Championships

Grand Tour general classification results timeline

References

External links

Lithuanian male cyclists
1985 births
Living people
Cyclists at the 2004 Summer Olympics
Cyclists at the 2008 Summer Olympics
Cyclists at the 2016 Summer Olympics
Olympic cyclists of Lithuania
Sportspeople from Panevėžys
Lithuanian Giro d'Italia stage winners
Lithuanian people of Russian descent
European Games competitors for Lithuania
Cyclists at the 2015 European Games